Srđan Vasiljević (born 1 April 1973) is a Serbian football manager and former player.

Career
Vasiljević came through the youth system of Red Star Belgrade. He went on to play for Radnički Beograd, Borac Čačak (twice), Obilić, Rad and Sartid Smederevo, before moving abroad. In early 2001, Vasiljević signed with Romanian club Dinamo București. He then joined Kazakhstan Premier League side Kairat in 2002, appearing in nine championship games that year. Vasiljević also made two appearances in the 2002–03 UEFA Cup.

After hanging up his boots, Vasiljević managed Serbian clubs Javor Ivanjica (twice), Čukarički, and BSK Borča. He also served as assistant manager to Vladimir Petrović and Radovan Ćurčić with the Serbia national team. In December 2017, Vasiljević was appointed manager of Angola. He left the Angola national team role in August 2019.

In 2021, he was signed in as the head coach of Angolan side Primeiro de Agosto

References

External links
 
 
 

1973 births
Living people
Footballers from Belgrade
Angola national football team managers
Association football defenders
Expatriate football managers in Angola
Expatriate footballers in Kazakhstan
Expatriate footballers in Romania
FC Dinamo București players
FC Kairat players
First League of Serbia and Montenegro players
FK Borac Čačak players
FK Čukarički managers
FK BSK Borča managers
FK Javor Ivanjica managers
FK Obilić players
FK Rad players
FK Radnički Beograd players
FK Smederevo players
Kazakhstan Premier League players
Red Star Belgrade non-playing staff
C.D. Primeiro de Agosto managers
Serbia and Montenegro expatriate footballers
Serbia and Montenegro footballers
Serbian expatriate football managers
Serbian expatriate sportspeople in Angola
Serbian expatriate sportspeople in Kazakhstan
Serbian expatriate sportspeople in Romania
Serbian football managers
Serbian footballers
Serbian SuperLiga managers
2019 Africa Cup of Nations managers